Komi Sélom Klassou (born February 10, 1960) is a Togolese politician who served as Prime Minister of Togo from 2015 to 2020. A member of the ruling Union for the Republic (UNIR), he served as Minister of Culture, Youth and Sports from 2000 to 2003, as Minister of Primary and Secondary Education from 2003 to 2007, and as First Vice-President of the National Assembly from 2007 to 2015.

Life and career
Klassou was born in Notsé in Haho Prefecture. He was appointed as Minister of Culture, Youth and Sports in the government named on October 8, 2000, serving in that position until he was appointed as Minister of Primary and Secondary Education in the government named on July 29, 2003. He also directed Faure Gnassingbé's campaign in the April 2005 presidential election, and after the Constitutional Court declared Gnassingbé the winner of the election, which was disputed by the opposition, Klassou called it "a great victory for the people of Togo".

Klassou served as Minister of Primary and Secondary Education for more than four years. He was the first candidate on the Rally of the Togolese People's candidate list for Haho Prefecture in the October 2007 parliamentary election and was successful in winning a seat. On November 24, 2007, he was elected as the First Vice-President of the National Assembly, and he was replaced in his ministerial post in the government named on December 13, 2007.

Klassou was a member of the Political Bureau of the RPT.

Klassou was re-elected to the National Assembly in the July 2013 parliamentary election, and he was re-elected as First Vice-President of the National Assembly on 2 September 2013.

Klassou was appointed as Prime Minister of Togo on 5 June 2015 following President Gnassingbé's re-election in the April 2015 presidential election. Klassou took office on 10 June 2015, succeeding Kwesi Ahoomey-Zunu. The composition of the new government headed by Klassou, which included 23 ministers, was announced on 28 June 2015.

By September 2020, President Faure Gnassingbé announced that Klassou had resigned.

References

Living people
1960 births
Prime Ministers of Togo
Government ministers of Togo
Members of the National Assembly (Togo)
Rally of the Togolese People politicians
Union for the Republic (Togo) politicians
21st-century Togolese politicians
21st-century Togolese people